The year 1722 in science and technology involved some significant events.

Chemistry
 René Antoine Ferchault de Réaumur publishes his work on metallurgy, L'Art de convertir le fer forge en acier, which describes how to convert iron into steel.

Exploration
 April 5 (Easter Sunday) – Jacob Roggeveen lands on Easter Island.

Mathematics
 Abraham de Moivre states de Moivre's formula, connecting complex numbers and trigonometry.

Meteorology
 A continuous series of weather records is begun in Uppsala by Anders Celsius; it will be maintained for at least 300 years.

Physics

Technology
 October – In clockmaking, George Graham demonstrates that his experiments, begun in December 1721, with mercurial compensation of the pendulum result in greater accuracy in timekeeping under conditions of variable temperature.

Births
 May 11 – Petrus Camper, Dutch comparative anatomist (died 1789)
 November 19 – Leopold Auenbrugger, Austrian physician (died 1809)
 December 28 – Eliza Lucas, American agronomist (died 1793)
 Thomas Barker, English meteorologist (died 1809)

Deaths
 May 20 – Sébastien Vaillant, French botanist (born 1669)

References

 
18th century in science
1720s in science